Brahmanand Swami (12 February 1772 – 1832) was revered as a saint of the Swaminarayan Sampraday and as one of Swaminarayan's Paramahamsa. He was also known as one of Swaminarayan's Ashta Kavi's (eight poets) within the Swaminarayan Sampraday  In the scriptures of the Swaminarayan Sampraday it was noted that Brahmanand Swami as stated by Swaminarayan that as the name suggests and implies "Brahmanand" is an Avatar of Brahma.

Biography 

Brahmanand Swami, born as Ladudanji, in Ashiya lineage of Charans to Shambhudanji Aashiya and Laluba Charan in Khan village, at the foot of Mount Abu, in Sirohi, in 1772 AD.

Even as a young boy, he showed his talent in the royal court by composing and reciting poems. The Rana of Sirohi, impressed with him, directed that he be taught Dingal (the science of constructing poetry) at the cost of the state. Hence, Ladudanji was well educated and later became a part of King of Udaipur's court. Ladu Dan learnt Dingal and Sanskrit scriptures from Ladhaji Rajput of Dhamadka, becoming a scholar in Dingal, poetry and scriptures. Ladudanji earned fame and wealth by his knowledge and talent of poetry. He was honored in the stately courts of Jaipur, Jodhpur, and others, which were impressed by his poetry.

Initiation as Sadhu

Ladudanji was in Bhuj where he had heard about Swaminarayan and went to meet him. Swaminarayan was addressing a gathering in Bhuj. Ladudanji was attracted to him. Swaminarayan returned to Gadhada with the poet Ladudanji. Ladudanji lived a majestic and royal life as befitting a courtier. He was always clad in the most precious attire, adorned with jewellery fit for royalty. Swaminarayan did not like such a luxurious life style but instead of preaching directly he gradually persuaded Ladudanji who became an ascetic. On the way from Gadhpur to Siddhapur, at a small village named Gerita, Swaminarayan stopped and administered Bhagwati Deeksha (initiation as sadhu) to Ladu Dan by giving sainthood name 'Shrirangdasji'. After some time, he was renamed as Brahmanand Swami.

Works

Like Muktanand Swami, Brahmanand Swami was an excellent poet.  His skills and brilliance in temple building is evident in temples like Muli, Vadtal and Junagadh. Besides the construction of great temples in Muli, Vadtal, Junagadh etc., Brahmanand Swami had written scriptures in Hindi and Gujarati.  'Brahmanand Kavya' is the collection of his works, a copy of which is preserved in the British Museum in London.

Notes

References
 
 Brahmanand Swami

External links
 
 Website of the Shri Swaminarayan Sampraday
 www.ssgd.org

Indian Hindu saints
Swaminarayan Sampradaya
People from Sirohi district
People from Mount Abu
Charan
Dingal poets